Cushman House may refer to:

 Cushman House (Baker, Louisiana), listed on the NRHP in Louisiana
 Charles L. Cushman House, Auburn, ME, listed on the NRHP in Maine
 Cushman House (Arlington, Massachusetts), listed on the NRHP in Massachusetts